Nanga Parbat is a mountain of the Himalayas, and the ninth-highest in the world.

Nanga Parbat may also refer to:

Nanga Parbat (film), a 2010 film
Nanga Parbat Mountain (Canada), a mountain on the border of Alberta and British Columbia

See also
2013 Nanga Parbat massacre, a mass murder
Nanda Parbat, a fictional Tibetan city in the DC Comics universe